Al-Jubail Club is a Saudi Arabian football team in Jubail City playing at the Saudi Fourth Division.

Current squad 
As of Saudi Third Division:

References

External links
 Al Jubail Club at Kooora.com

Jubail
1965 establishments in Saudi Arabia
Association football clubs established in 1965
Football clubs in Eastern Province, Saudi Arabia